Taing Sunlay is the director of the Phnom Penh, Cambodia Municipal Court. He replaced Ang Mealaktei, who was sacked after only one year due to corruption charges.

References

Living people
Cambodian judges
Year of birth missing (living people)